Jerome Joseph Vayda (July 18, 1934 – February 16, 1978) was an American basketball player. At a height of 6'4" (1.93 m) tall, he played at the small forward position.

College career
Vayda attended the University of North Carolina at Chapel Hill, where he played college basketball with the Tar Heels. He was named to the ACC's All Second Team, in 1954.

National team career
As a member of the U.S. Air Force, Vayda represented the senior men's USA national basketball team, at the 1959 FIBA World Championship. He scored a total of 162 points during the tournament, for a scoring average of 18.0 points per game. With the US, he won the tournament's silver medal.

Personal life
Vayda was born in Bayonne, New Jersey, on July 18, 1934, to his parents Joseph G. Vayda and Anna C. Vayda. He died on February 16, 1978, at the age of 43, due to a heart attack. He is survived by two children Catherine J. Vayda, and William J. Vayda.

References

External links 
FIBA Profile
Sports-Reference.com profile

1934 births
1978 deaths
Amateur Athletic Union men's basketball players
American men's basketball players
Basketball players from New Jersey
North Carolina Tar Heels men's basketball players
Power forwards (basketball)
Small forwards
Sportspeople from Bayonne, New Jersey
United States men's national basketball team players
1959 FIBA World Championship players